Athylia viduata is a species of longhorn beetle in the subfamily Lamiinae. It was described by Pascoe in 1864.

References

Athylia
Beetles described in 1864